Canister may refer to:
 Any container that is roughly cylindrical in shape
 A container for 35mm movie film or 35mm photo film for use in cameras
 Pods used for parachute supply drops
 Gas containers used for riot control
 A perforated metal box which is part of a gas mask
 The carbon dioxide scrubber of a rebreather
 The filter which absorbs gasoline vapour in a car tank 
 A cylindrical bell worn by sheep, that was traditionally used in Sussex, England, especially on the South Downs
 Canister shot, a type of artillery round used in warfare as anti-personnel ammunition

See also
 Tin can (refers more specifically to a metal canister)
 Jerrycan – robust liquid container made from pressed steel.
 Water canister